Trayvon Andrew Dwayne Robinson (born September 1, 1987) is an American professional baseball left fielder for the Lancaster Barnstormers of the Atlantic League of Professional Baseball. He played in Major League Baseball (MLB) for the Seattle Mariners in 2011 and 2012.

Professional career

Los Angeles Dodgers

Robinson was drafted in the 10th round of the 2005 MLB Draft by the Los Angeles Dodgers out of Crenshaw High School in Los Angeles.

After two seasons with the Gulf Coast Dodgers and one with the Vero Beach Dodgers, he was promoted in 2007 with the Class A Great Lakes Loons. In 2009 with the Class A-Advanced Inland Empire 66ers of San Bernardino, he hit .306 with 15 home runs and 43 stolen bases. He was selected to the midseason California League All-Star team. He was added to the Dodgers 40-man roster in 2009. In 2010, he was assigned to the Chattanooga Lookouts in the Double-A Southern League. With the Lookouts, he was selected to the Southern League All-Star Game. He appeared in 120 games in 2010, hitting .300, with nine home runs, 57 runs batted in (RBIs) and 38 steals. At the conclusion of the season, he appeared for the Phoenix Desert Dogs in the Arizona Fall League and was selected to appear in the AFL "Rising Stars" game. He was assigned to the Triple-A Albuquerque Isotopes for 2011, where he was selected to the Pacific Coast League mid-season all-star team. He also competed in the Triple-A Home Run Derby. He hit .293 for the Isotopes in 100 games with 26 home runs.

Seattle Mariners
On July 31, 2011, Robinson was traded to the Seattle Mariners in a three-team trade that sent Érik Bédard to the Boston Red Sox. He made his major league debut with the Mariners on August 5, starting in left field against the Los Angeles Angels of Anaheim, and robbed Torii Hunter of a two-run home run. He recorded his first major league hit, a single to left off Jered Weaver, in his second at-bat.  His first major league home run was scored the next day, in the seventh inning against Angels pitcher Tyler Chatwood. He played in 90 Major League games for the Mariners in 2011 and 2012 and hit .215 with 5 homers and 26 RBI.

Baltimore Orioles
On November 20, 2012, he was traded to the Baltimore Orioles for Robert Andino. He was subsequently designated for assignment on February 8, 2013. After clearing waivers, he was assigned to the Orioles Triple-A affiliate in Norfolk, where he hit .220 in 52 games.

Los Angeles Dodgers
He signed a minor league contract to return to the Dodgers organization on January 24, 2014. He played in 117 games for the Isotopes with a .235 batting average, 6 homers and 30 RBI.

San Diego Padres/Arizona Diamondbacks
On December 15, 2014, he signed a minor league contract with the San Diego Padres. After the Padres released him on April 2, 2015, the Arizona Diamondbacks acquired him on April 20 and subsequently assigned him to their AAA affiliate, the Reno Aces. He was then released by the Diamondbacks on June 22, 2015.

Detroit Tigers
On July 3, 2015, the Detroit Tigers signed Robinson to a minor league contract.

Somerset Patriots
Robinson signed with the Somerset Patriots of the Atlantic League of Professional Baseball for the 2016 season. In 64 games he hit .235/.296/.401 with 9 home runs and 28 RBIs.

Lancaster Barnstormers
On July 22, 2016, Robinson signed with the Lancaster Barnstormers of the Atlantic League of Professional Baseball. He re-signed with the club for the 2017 & 2018 seasons. He became a free agent following the 2018 season where he hit .295/.382/.442 with 7 home runs and 49 RBIs.

Pittsburgh Pirates
On March 5, 2019, Robinson signed a minor league deal with the Pittsburgh Pirates. On July 6, 2019, he was named to the International League All-Star roster for the 32nd Triple-A All-Star Game. He became a free agent following the 2019 season.

Chicago White Sox
On January 17, 2020, Robinson signed a minor league deal with the Chicago White Sox. He was released prior to the season on June 18, 2020.

Lancaster Barnstormers (second stint)
On April 15, 2021, Robinson signed with the Lancaster Barnstormers of the Atlantic League of Professional Baseball. In 94 games with the Barnstormers, Robinson hit .235/.353/.364 with 8 home runs, 46 RBI, and 12 stolen bases. He became a free agent following the season. 

Robinson re-signed with Lancaster for the 2022 season on June 3, 2022, and played in 88 games, hitting .287/.374/.441 with 9 home runs and 51 RBIs. With Lancaster, he won the Atlantic League championship.

On February 15, 2023, Robinson re-signed with the Barnstormers for the 2023 season.

References

External links

1987 births
Living people
African-American baseball players
Albuquerque Isotopes players
Baseball players from Los Angeles
Bowie Baysox players
Chattanooga Lookouts players
Great Lakes Loons players
Gulf Coast Dodgers players
Inland Empire 66ers of San Bernardino players
Leones del Caracas players
American expatriate baseball players in Venezuela
Major League Baseball left fielders
Norfolk Tides players
Ogden Raptors players
Phoenix Desert Dogs players
Peoria Javelinas players
Peoria Saguaros players
Reno Aces players
Seattle Mariners players
Crenshaw High School alumni
Tacoma Rainiers players
Toledo Mud Hens players
Vero Beach Dodgers players
Somerset Patriots players
Águilas del Zulia players
Lancaster Barnstormers players
Indianapolis Indians players
21st-century African-American sportspeople
20th-century African-American people